Hoskote Assembly seat (also spelled Hosakote) is one of the seats in Karnataka State Assembly in India. It is part of Chikballapur Lok Sabha seat.

Members of Assembly

Mysore State (Hosakote Anekal constituency)
 1951 (Seat-1): Lakshmidevi Ramanna (Congress)
 1951 (Seat-2): H. T. Puttappa (Congress)

Mysore State (Hosakote)

Election results

2018 Assembly Election
 N Nagaraju (M.T.B) (Congress) : 98,824 votes  
 Sharath Kumar Bachegowda (BJP) : 91,227 votes

2019 by-poll
 Sharath Kumar Bachegowda (Independent) : 81,671 votes 
 M T B Nagaraj (BJP) : 70,185

1967 Assembly Election
 N. C. Gowda (INC) : 30,530 votes 
 B. C. Gowda	(SWA) :	13337

1952

See also 
 List of constituencies of Karnataka Legislative Assembly

References 

Assembly constituencies of Karnataka